Anni 90 is a 1992 Italian sketch comedy film directed by Enrico Oldoini.

An anthological sequel entitled Anni 90: Parte II was released in 1993.

Cast

Reception
It opened in Italy on 36 screens and grossed 1.2 billion lire, finishing second to Lethal Weapon 3 at the box office for the week. In its third week of release it reached number one at the Italian box office and was there for two weeks. It went on to gross $6 million, the fifth highest-grossing Italian film for the year in Italy and the 12th overall.

References

External links

1992 films
Films directed by Enrico Oldoini
1990s Italian-language films
1992 comedy films
Italian comedy films
Sketch comedy films
1990s Italian films